This article contains various lists of state leaders organized by age, defined as heads of state and/or heads of government.

Oldest serving state leaders

Top ten currently serving

People currently serving as head of state and/or head of government, a party leader of a one-party state, or a representative of a head of state.

Top ten of all time

Youngest serving state leaders

Top ten currently serving

Top ten since 1905

Oldest state leaders
The following lists show the oldest people who have served office as state leader (not limited to their age while in office).

Top ten living

Top ten since 1800

See also
Lists of state leaders

Notes

Lists of state leaders by age